Eläintarhan ajot (Suomen Grand Prix in Finnish, Djurgårdsloppet in Swedish, Eltsun ajot in slang) or Suomen Suurajot (Finnish Grand Race) as it was called in 1932 was a motor racing competition arranged between years 1932 and 1963 in Eläintarha, Helsinki, Finland. The idea for the race came from a racing driver, S. P. J. Keinänen. Its racing history included the pre-war Finnish Grand Prix.

First race
The first Grand Prix-race was a success and it attracted around 25,000 spectators. There were ten cars in the first start, six of them Finnish and four Swedish. The very first win went to the Swede Per Viktor Widengren who drove a Mercedes-Benz, second to qualify was S. P. J. Keinänen in a Chrysler and the third place went to Karl Ebb driving a Mercedes-Benz.

Motorcycles
Motorcycle races were also held from the beginning – the first motorcycle win was also taken by a Swede – Gunnar Kalén. The best-placed Finn was Raine Lampinen who finished second in the lower class.

Last race

The Eläintarha race was an annual happening in Helsinki for almost 30 years until the final race was held in 1963. The winner of this last race was Timo Mäkinen, although the main start (Formula Junior) was canceled after a fatal accident. At the start a driver (whose identity has not been confirmed) hit Curt Lincoln's Brabham BT6 (Formula Junior), and the car slid to the left side of track. Most drivers managed to avoid a collision but the Swedish Örjan Atterberg hit his countryman Freddy Kottulinsky. Unfortunately Atterberg's car flipped over and the driver was pinned under his vehicle. As a result of the crash Atterberg sustained fatal injuries. The race was stopped by the race officials one minute after crash and the jury told the race was over.

As the setup was considered too dangerous this was the final race to be conducted on the city circuit. The racing events that followed the ill-fated Eläintarha race were held at Keimola Motor Stadium between 1966–1978.

In the 1930s motor racing events were also arranged couple of times in Munkkiniemi, a residential district in northwest Helsinki.

Afterwards
The race has been arranged three times since to honour its memory – the first time was in 1982, then 1992 and the last time was in 2002. In the 1992 event Juan Manuel Fangio was present. Around 2005, a detailed and driveable virtual recreation of the circuit appeared for the Grand Prix Legends historical racing simulation.

Statistics
Active years: 1932–39 and 1946–63
Circuit length:  (1932),    (from 1933)
Lap record: David Hitches, Lola Mk 5 Ford, time: 57.1 seconds/ (1963)
Most spectators: 82,597  (1958)
Most wins: Curt Lincoln (14)

Results 1932–1963

References

External links 
 Video archive – Eläintarhanajot, YLE 

National Grands Prix
Finnish Grand Prix
Motorsport venues in Finland
Pre-World Championship Grands Prix
Elaintarhan
Formula One non-championship races
20th century in Helsinki
Recurring sporting events established in 1932
Sports competitions in Helsinki
1932 establishments in Finland
1963 disestablishments in Finland